Forever Pure is a 2016 UK-Israel documentary film, by Maya Zinshtein. The film is directed by Maya Zinshtein, and produced by Geoff Arbourne and Maya Zinshtein, co-produced by Torstein Grude and Alan Maher, and executive produced by John Battsek and Nicole Stott. The film was released on Netflix on 6 July 2017 and went on to win a News & Documentary Emmy Award in 2018. The film was produced by Inside Out Films and Maya Films.

Production
Production for the film began in 2012 when Zinshtein, who was working as a journalist, made on short segments for the investigative program  ("Fact").

Zinshtein, who was freelancing for the Israeli show, was assigned to follow two Chechen players for a few hours on their first day in Israel. After four days of filming, she realised that the story wasn't going to end there. After the short TV segment had been shown, she decided to do it by herself and started a four-year journey of making the feature documentary.

Synopsis
Beitar Jerusalem F.C. is the most popular and controversial football team in Israel, the only club in the Premier League never to sign an Arab player. Midway through the 2012–13 season, a secretive transfer deal by the owner, Russian-Israeli oligarch Arcadi Gaydamak, brought two Muslim players from Chechnya.

The deal inspired the most racist campaign in Israeli sport that sent the club spiralling out of control. One season in a life of this famed club is a story of Israeli society, personal identity, politics, money and a window into how racism is destroying a team and society from within.

Release

The film competed in the documentary section, and it won The Van Leer Award for Best Director of a Documentary, The Haggiag Award for Best Editing and The Jewish Experience Awards – Honorable Mention. The film then went on to have its International première at the Toronto International Film Festival.

Reception

Critical reception
Forever Pure received critical acclaim. Review aggregation website Rotten Tomatoes certified the film as "fresh" with a score of 94%.

Wendy Ide found the film to be a "eye-opening documentary that traces the tumultuous 2012-13 season, during which the political affiliations of a vocal group of the team’s loyal fans threatened to tear the club to pieces... [a] high quality-piece of factual filmmaking.""

Accolades
After airing in the United States on the PBS series Independent Lens, Forever Pure'' won a News & Documentary Emmy Award in 2018 for Outstanding Politics and Government Documentary.

See also 

 'Til Kingdom Come

References

External links
 Official Website for the film
 
 
 

2016 documentary films
2016 films
2010s Hebrew-language films
Israeli independent films
Football in Israel
Israeli documentary films
2016 independent films
Documentary films about association football